Judar (also Romanized as Jūdar and Jowdar; also known as Jow Darreh and Chūdar) is a village in Gifan Rural District, Garmkhan District, Bojnord County, North Khorasan Province, Iran. At the 2006 census, its population was 236, in 62 families.

References 

Populated places in Bojnord County